Stig Wennerström (born 31 March 1943) is a Swedish sailor.  Competing in the Soling class he won a silver medal at the 1972 Summer Olympics and a gold medal at the 1970 World Championships, placing third in 1973.

References

1943 births
Living people
Swedish male sailors (sport)
Olympic sailors of Sweden
Olympic silver medalists for Sweden
Olympic medalists in sailing
Medalists at the 1972 Summer Olympics
Sailors at the 1972 Summer Olympics – Soling
Star class sailors
Sportspeople from Gothenburg
European Champions Soling
Soling class world champions